Fažana (Italian: Fasana) is a village and a municipality on the western coast of Istria, in Croatia.

Yugoslavia's former President, Josip Broz Tito, was fond of Fažana and the Brijuni Islands, spending up to six months of his year there.
According to the 1921 census, 100% of the population spoke italian.

References

Populated coastal places in Croatia
Municipalities of Croatia
Populated places in Istria County
Italian-speaking territorial units in Croatia